Carte Blanche (French, literally 'blank/white card', but figuratively 'unlimited discretionary power to act') may refer to:

 Blank cheque, a cheque with no monetary value entered, figuratively an open-ended agreement

Arts and entertainment

Music
 , a musical project of Riton
 Carte Blanche (Rachid Taha album), 1997
 Carte Blanche (Phat Kat album), 2007
 Carte Blanche (DJ Snake album), 2019
 "Carte Blanche", a 1999 song by Veracocha
 "Carte Blanche", a song from the 1981 musical film Shock Treatment 
 "Carte Blanche", a song by Oktobar 1864 from the 1987 album Oktobar 1864

Television
 Carte Blanche (TV series), a South African investigative journalism show
 "Carte Blanche", a 2003 episode of The Shield
 Yvette Carte-Blanche, a fictional character in 'Allo 'Allo!

Other uses in arts and entertainment
 Carte Blanche (Norwegian dance company), the Norwegian national company of contemporary dance
 Carte Blanche (novel), a 2011 James Bond novel by Jeffery Deaver
 Carte Blanche, a 1965 painting by René Magritte

Other uses
 Carte blanche (cards), a playing card hand with no courts
 Carte Blanche (champagne), by Louis Roederer
 Carte Blanche (credit card), by Diners Club International
 Carte Blanche (1955 NATO exercise)

See also

 Tabula rasa ('blank slate'), the theory that individuals are born without built-in mental content 
 Full Powers, the authority of a person to sign a treaty on behalf of a sovereign state.
 Carta blanca ('White card'), a Spanish TV programme
 Carta Blanca, a beer by Cuauhtémoc Moctezuma Brewery
 Champ Libre ('Free field'), a French publisher 
 Blanche (disambiguation)
 Blank (disambiguation)
 Carte (disambiguation)
 Card (disambiguation)